This is a list of Chinese national-type primary schools (SJK(C)) in Malacca, Malaysia. As of June 2022, there are 65 Chinese primary schools with a total of 15,478 students.

List of Chinese national-type primary schools in Malacca

Alor Gajah District

Jasin District

Central Malacca District

See also 
 Lists of Chinese national-type primary schools in Malaysia

References

 
Schools in Malacca
Malacca
 Chinese-language schools in Malaysia